New Zealand competed at the 2006 Winter Olympics in Turin, Italy.

The nation sent its largest team ever to the games with 18 athletes, 7 more than in Salt Lake City in 2002. New Zealand has only won a single Winter Olympics medal, a silver medal in Albertville.

Alpine skiing 

New Zealand's top finisher in alpine skiing, Mickey Ross, survived a fall in the first run of the men's slalom to record a 31st-place finish.

Bobsleigh 

The New Zealand team did not compete in the four-man bobsleigh due to injuries from a training run. Mathew Dallow and Alan Henderson did compete in the two-man event, but did not qualify for the final run.

Curling 

The New Zealand national men's team qualified for the games after placing 8th at the 2005 World Championships. The team heading to Turin was skipped by Sean Becker, out of Ranfurly CC. The New Zealand men's team is the first team from the southern hemisphere to compete in curling as an official sport at the Olympics. Australia had previously competed in curling at the Olympics, but that was as a demonstration sport.

Sean Becker's rink twice lost games late, including giving up two in the final end to fall to the eventual silver medalists from Finland. However, these were the only bright spots for the New Zealand side, which finished the round robin in last place, without a victory.

Men's

Team: Sean Becker (skip), Hans Frauenlob, Dan Mustapic, Lorne Depape, Warren Dobson (alternate)'''

Round Robin
Draw 1
;Draw 2
;Draw 3
;Draw 4
;Draw 6
;Draw 8
;Draw 10
;Draw 11
;Draw 12

Standings

Skeleton 

Skeleton provided New Zealand with its two best finishes in Turin, including its only top-10, from Ben Sandford. Sandford had the fifth fastest second run, but his slower first run left him in 10th place.

Snowboarding 

All three New Zealand snowboarders in Turin competed in the halfpipe, with Juliane Bray being the closest to qualifying for the final, finishing 16th overall. Bray also entered the snowboard cross, but was unable to qualify for the knockout rounds.

Halfpipe

Note: In the final, the single best score from two runs is used to determine the ranking. A bracketed score indicates a run that wasn't counted.

Snowboard Cross

Flag bearer
Sean Becker, the captain of New Zealand's curling team, carried the flag for the New Zealand team in both the opening and closing ceremonies. There was some controversy about the later of these, as the position of closing ceremony flag bearer is usually reserved for the best-performed competitor from the country and the curling team had finished last in their competition.

Traditionally the New Zealand team flag bearer at an Olympic games wears a blessed Māori cloak called the Kotahu.

See also
 New Zealand Olympic Committee
 New Zealand Olympic medallists
 Sport in New Zealand

References

External links
 New Zealand Olympic Committee
 New Zealand Winter Olympics Team
 Snow Sports New Zealand
 Speed Skating New Zealand
 Skeleton New Zealand
 New Zealand Curling Association

Nations at the 2006 Winter Olympics
2006
Winter Olympics